This is a list of ambassadors to Switzerland. Note that some ambassadors are responsible for more than one country while others are directly accredited to Bern.

See also
 Foreign relations of Switzerland
 List of diplomatic missions of Switzerland
 List of diplomatic missions in Switzerland

References
  Diplomatic Corps (fr)

 
 
Switzerland